Zanclognatha obscuripennis, the dark zanclognatha, is a litter moth of the family Erebidae. It was described by Augustus Radcliffe Grote in 1872. It is found in North America from Missouri to Quebec, south to Florida and Texas.

Adults are on wing from April to June. There are two generations in most of its range. There are continuous broods in Florida.

The larvae feed on detritus, including dead leaves.

External links

obscuripennis
Moths described in 1872
Moths of North America
Taxa named by Augustus Radcliffe Grote